The 2019 Tilia Slovenia Open was a professional tennis tournament played on hard courts. It was the seventh edition of the tournament which was part of the 2019 ATP Challenger Tour. It took place in Portorož, Slovenia between 12 – 18 August 2019.

Singles main-draw entrants

Seeds

 1 Rankings are as of 5 August 2019.

Other entrants
The following players received wildcards into the singles main draw:
  Tom Kočevar-Dešman
  Sven Lah
  Zvonimir Orešković
  Nik Razboršek
  Mike Urbanija

The following players received entry into the singles main draw as alternates:
  Artem Dubrivnyy
  Andrey Golubev

The following players received entry into the singles main draw using their ITF World Tennis Ranking:
  Tomás Martín Etcheverry
  Maxime Hamou
  Tom Jomby
  Quentin Robert
  Matías Zukas

The following players received entry from the qualifying draw:
  Nicolás Barrientos
  Tomás Lipovšek Puches

Champions

Singles

  Aljaž Bedene def.  Viktor Durasovic 7–5, 6–3.

Doubles

  Teymuraz Gabashvili /  Carlos Gómez-Herrera def.  Lucas Miedler /  Tristan-Samuel Weissborn 6–3, 6–2.

References

2019 ATP Challenger Tour
2019
2019 in Slovenian tennis
August 2019 sports events in Europe